A. dianthi may refer to:

 Alternaria dianthi, a plant pathogen
 Anarta dianthi, a moth of the family Noctuidae